Colin Tartt (born 23 November 1950) is an English former footballer. A midfielder, he made 478 league appearances in a 13-year career in the Football League.

A qualified teacher, he began his career with Port Vale in 1972. He spent five years at the club, before being sold on to Chesterfield for £15,000 in March 1977. He helped the club to lift the Anglo-Scottish Cup in 1981, before he returned to Port Vale for a £15,000 fee in November of that year. He spent four years with the "Valiants", helping the club to achieve promotion out of the Fourth Division in 1982–83. He later returned to teaching and played non-league football for Shepshed Charterhouse and Matlock Town.

Career

Port Vale
Tartt qualified as a teacher at Alsager College, before he joined Port Vale, initially on trial, in June 1972. His made his debut as a substitute in a 7–0 drubbing by Rotherham United at Millmoor on 26 August 1972, and made his first full debut on 26 September in a 4–0 defeat to Bournemouth at Dean Court. Tartt impressed, despite the embarrassing score-lines (goalkeeper Alan Boswell was held responsible) and became a regular in the side, making 32 appearances in 1972–73, as the "Valiants" missed out on promotion out of the Third Division by four points. He had to be pulled away by the police from Wrexham's Arfon Griffiths on the full-time whistle of Vale's 1–0 win at Vale Park on 1 October 1973, in what was described as an 'ugly' game. Tarrt played a total of 45 games in 1973–74, retaining his first team place as manager Gordon Lee departed in January, and was replaced by Roy Sproson. He played 38 games in 1974–75, as Vale again finished four points short of the promotion places. He scored his first senior goal on 13 September 1975, in a 3–3 draw with Southend United at Roots Hall, and went on to become something of a regular scorer in 1975–76, hitting five goals in 48 games. Tarrt scored four goals in 31 appearances in 1976–77, before he was sold to Chesterfield for £15,000 in March 1977.

Chesterfield
Tartt scored on his Chesterfield debut, in a 3–2 defeat at Lincoln City on 5 March 1976. The "Spireites" finished one place above Port Vale in 1976–77, before manager Arthur Cox took them to within eight points of the promotion places in 1977–78. However they dropped to just one place and four points above the drop zone in 1978–79, before rising to one place and one point off the promotion places in 1979–80. New manager Frank Barlow took the Saltergate outfit to another unsuccessful promotion push in 1980–81, as they finished two places and three points behind promoted Charlton Athletic, and only five points behind champions Rotherham United. He was a key member of the side that lifted the last ever instalment of the Anglo-Scottish Cup, despite Rangers manager John Greig calling him "the worst full-back in Europe". He was once booked by a referee for playing 'keepie-uppie' in an FA Cup win over Sheffield United, despite there being no law against the 'offence' in the rulebook. He played a total of 225 league and cup games for Chesterfield, scoring nine goals.

Return to Port Vale
Tartt returned to Port Vale on loan in October 1981, who were now in the Fourth Division under the stewardship of John McGrath. He regained his old position and was transferred back to the club for £15,000 the next month, thereby joining Chesterfield teammate Ernie Moss, who was signed by Vale for £12,000. Tarrt hit four goals in 43 games in 1981–82. He was transfer listed in December 1982 following a bust-up with McGrath. However, he retained his first team place, hitting two goals in 48 appearances as Vale won promotion in 1982–83, playing alongside former Chesterfield teammate John Ridley. Tarrt hit three goals in 29 games in 1983–84, but lost his place March 1984 after John Rudge replaced McGrath as manager. Relegated back into the basement division, Rudge attempted to rebuild the squad, and so gave Tartt a free transfer in May 1985, following two goals in 15 games in 1984–85. He marked his last appearance for the "Valiants" on the final day of the campaign with a goal from the half-way line against Scunthorpe United at the Old Showground. He later played for Shepshed Charterhouse and Matlock Town in the Midland Football Alliance and Northern Premier League, and returned to teaching.

Style of play
Tartt was a tough and hard working midfielder who had an erratic shooting ability.

Career statistics
Source:

Honours
Chesterfield
Anglo-Scottish Cup: 1981

Port Vale
Football League Fourth Division fourth-place promotion: 1982–83

References

1950 births
Living people
Footballers from Liverpool
English footballers
Association football midfielders
Port Vale F.C. players
Chesterfield F.C. players
Shepshed Dynamo F.C. players
Matlock Town F.C. players
English Football League players
Midland Football Alliance players
Northern Premier League players
Schoolteachers from Merseyside